Elections to Antrim Borough Council were held on 20 May 1981 on the same day as the other Northern Irish local government elections. The election used three district electoral areas to elect a total of 15 councillors.

Election results

Note: "Votes" are the first preference votes.

Districts summary

|- class="unsortable" align="centre"
!rowspan=2 align="left"|Ward
! % 
!Cllrs
! % 
!Cllrs
! %
!Cllrs
! %
!Cllrs
! % 
!Cllrs
! %
!Cllrs
!rowspan=2|TotalCllrs
|- class="unsortable" align="center"
!colspan=2 bgcolor="" | UUP
!colspan=2 bgcolor="" | DUP
!colspan=2 bgcolor="" | SDLP
!colspan=2 bgcolor="" | Alliance
!colspan=2 bgcolor="" | IIP
!colspan=2 bgcolor="white"| Others
|-
|align="left"|Area A
|bgcolor="40BFF5"|33.1
|bgcolor="40BFF5"|2
|19.2
|1
|21.7
|1
|2.4
|0
|21.8
|1
|1.8
|0
|5
|-
|align="left"|Area B
|bgcolor="40BFF5"|49.0
|bgcolor="40BFF5"|3
|27.6
|1
|15.4
|1
|8.0
|0
|0.0
|0
|0.0
|0
|5
|-
|align="left"|Area C
|bgcolor="40BFF5"|34.8
|bgcolor="40BFF5"|2
|34.6
|2
|0.0
|0
|18.7
|1
|0.0
|0
|11.9
|0
|5
|-
|- class="unsortable" class="sortbottom" style="background:#C9C9C9"
|align="left"| Total
|38.0
|7
|28.1
|4
|10.7
|2
|10.9
|1
|6.6
|1
|5.7
|0
|15
|-
|}

Districts results

Area A

1977: 2 x UUP, 1 x DUP, 1 x Independent, 1 x Independent Nationalist
1981: 2 x UUP, 1 x DUP, 1 x SDLP, 1 x IIP
1977-1981 Change: SDLP gain from Independent, Independent Nationalist joins IIP

Area B

1977: 3 x UUP, 1 x DUP, 1 x Alliance
1981: 3 x UUP, 1 x DUP, 1 x SDLP
1977-1981 Change: SDLP gain from Alliance

Area C

1977: 3 x UUP, 1 x DUP, 1 x Alliance
1981: 2 x UUP, 2 x DUP, 1 x Alliance
1977-1981 Change: DUP gain from UUP

References

Antrim Borough Council elections
Antrim